Clio is a city in Genesee County in the U.S. state of Michigan.  The city is located entirely within Vienna Township, but is administratively autonomous. As of the 2010 census, the city had a population of 2,646.

Along with the rest of Genesee County, Clio is part of the Flint metropolitan statistical area.

History

The location was first settled in 1837 by Theodore P. Dean. Originally named Varna after the city's first grain buyer. Pere Marquette Railroad  came through and put a station there in 1861. Its name was changed in 1866 to Clio, the muse of history.

On July 23, 2007, Governor Jennifer Granholm announced Clio as a community chosen by the Michigan State Housing Development Authority (MSHDA), to take part in the Blueprints for Downtowns program.  Clio would receive a comprehensive, market-driven strategy toward developing an
action-oriented downtown that would result in economic growth, job creation
and private investments.  The Blueprints for Downtowns award, were announced to be also received by the communities of  Caro and Ypsilanti.  Scottville received a similar award to take part in the Cool Cities Michigan Main Street program.

On Monday November 27, 2017, the northern loop set of municipalities, including Clio, began receiving water from the Karegnondi Water Authority pipeline and treated by Genesee County Drain Commission Water and Waste Division.

Geography 

Demographics

2010 census
As of the census of 2010, there were 2,646 people, 1,196 households, and 654 families living in the city. The racial makeup of the city was 95.2% White, 1.1% African American, 0.6% Native American, 0.2% Asian, 0.8% from other races, and 2.1% from two or more races. Hispanic or Latino of any race were 3.2% of the population.

There were 1,196 households, of which 30.4% had children under the age of 18 living with them, 33.0% were married couples living together, 16.2% had a female householder with no husband present, 5.4% had a male householder with no wife present, and 45.3% were non-families. 38.6% of all households were made up of individuals, and 15.6% had someone living alone who was 65 years of age or older. The average household size was 2.21 and the average family size was 2.93.

The median age in the city was 35.7 years. 24.3% of residents were under the age of 18; 11.4% were between the ages of 18 and 24; 26% were from 25 to 44; 22.8% were from 45 to 64; and 15.5% were 65 years of age or older. The gender makeup of the city was 47.2% male and 52.8% female.

2000 census
As of the census of 2000, there were 2,483 people, 1,093 households, and 659 families living in the city. The racial makeup of the city was 95.49% White, 0.48% African American, 0.60% Native American, 0.16% Asian, 0.04% Pacific Islander, 0.81% from other races, and 2.42% from two or more races. Hispanic or Latino of any race were 2.22% of the population.

There were 1,093 households, out of which 29.0% had children under the age of 18 living with them, 40.3% were married couples living together, 15.6% had a female householder with no husband present, and 39.7% were non-families. 32.8% of all households were made up of individuals, and 10.4% had someone living alone who was 65 years of age or older. The average household size was 2.27 and the average family size was 2.88.

In the city, the population was spread out, with 24.2% under the age of 18, 12.0% from 18 to 24, 30.6% from 25 to 44, 19.5% from 45 to 64, and 13.7% who were 65 years of age or older. The median age was 34 years. For every 100 females, there were 89.3 males. For every 100 females age 18 and over, there were 87.2 males.

The median income for a household in the city was $35,859, and the median income for a family was $42,155. Males had a median income of $37,109 versus $24,706 for females. The per capita income for the city was $19,727. About 5.7% of families and 7.9% of the population were below the poverty line, including 10.3% of those under age 18 and 4.1% of those age 65 or over.

Government
Clio receives water from the Karegnondi Water Authority pipeline treated by Genesee County Drain Commission Water and Waste Division. Fire services are provide by the Clio Area Fire Authority, as do Thetford and Vienna Townships, under an authority board.

Clio is within of the following:
 Genesee County Commissioner District 7
 Michigan House of Representatives District 48
 State Senate District 27
 67th District Court Division 1
 Michigan's 5th Congressional District
 Genesee District Library
 Clio Area School District

Notable people
 Cam "Buzz" Brainard, an American voice actor, narrator, and radio personality.
 John D. Cherry, 60th Lieutenant Governor of Michigan (2003 to 2011)

References

External links

 City of Clio
 Clio Chamber of Commerce

Cities in Genesee County, Michigan
1873 establishments in Michigan